Celeste D'Arrando is an Italian politician. She was elected to be a deputy to the Parliament of Italy in the 2018 Italian general election for the Legislature XVIII of Italy.

Career
D'Arrando was born on March 23, 1985 in Turin.

She was elected to the Italian Parliament in the 2018 Italian general election, to represent the district of Piedmont 1 for the Five Star Movement.

References

Living people
Five Star Movement politicians
1985 births
Deputies of Legislature XVIII of Italy
Politicians from Turin
21st-century Italian women politicians
Women members of the Chamber of Deputies (Italy)